Maurino R. Richton (August 3, 1909–April 30, 1995) was an American politician and lawyer.

Richton was born in Chicago Heights, Illinois. He graduated from Bloom High School in Chicago Heights, Illinois. Richon received his Bachelor's Degree from Northwestern University in 1933 and his law degree from John Marshall Law School in Chicago, Illinois. He also studied at University of Chicago. Richton served in the United States Army during World War II His training at Camp Ritchie in Maryland makes him one of the Ritchie Boys. He practiced law in Chicago Heights and served as the  attorney for the Chicago Heights Elementary School District No. 170. Richton served as the mayor of Chicago Heights from 1947 to 1951 and from 1963 to 1967. He then served in the Illinois House of Representatives in 1959 and 1960. Richton was a Republican. Richton died at his home in Chicago Heights, Illinois.

Notes

1909 births
1995 deaths
People from Chicago Heights, Illinois
Military personnel from Illinois
Ritchie Boys
Illinois lawyers
Northwestern University alumni
John Marshall Law School (Chicago) alumni
University of Chicago alumni
Mayors of places in Illinois
Republican Party members of the Illinois House of Representatives
20th-century American politicians
20th-century American lawyers